Tan Sri Norian Mai (born 5 November 1946) was the sixth Inspector-General of Police (IGP) of Malaysia and served from 8 January 1999 until his retirement on 4 November 2003.

Education 
Norian attended Government English School in Teluk Intan in 1959 and Alam Shah School in Kuala Lumpur in 1964. He graduated from the University of Malaya in 1982 with a Bachelor of Arts degree in history.

Career 
Norian joined the Police Force as a Cadet Assistant Superintendent on 8 November 1969. He served various positions including Officer-in-Charge of Police District (OCPD) of Jasin and OCPD of Petaling Jaya.

On 31 December 1984, he was appointed Terengganu Police Chief. On 31 December 1992, he was appointed Selangor Police Chief. On 1 April 1994, he transferred to Bukit Aman to become Director of Special Branch. Norian Mai became the Deputy Inspector-General of Police on 6 May 1997 who replace Samsuri Arshad.

Inspector-General of Police 
On 8 January 1999, Norian became the IGP when his predecessor Abdul Rahim Mohd. Noor resigned over the beating of former Deputy Prime Minister Anwar Ibrahim at the Bukit Aman police lock-up.

Post-career 
Norian founded Yayasan Pengaman Malaysia in 2011 and became its Founding Chairman. He has been Chairman of Perdana Global Peace Foundation as well.

In 2019, Norian sat in the Royal Commission of Inquiry on Wang Kelian along with seven other members as deputy to Chairman Arifin Zakaria.

On 9 February 2021, he was appointed to the Emergency Independent Special Committee along with 18 other members to advise the Yang di-Pertuan Agong on matters related to the ending of the Proclamation of Emergency in the country.

Honours
 :
 Officer of the Order of the Defender of the Realm (KMN) (1983)
 Commander of the Order of Loyalty to the Crown of Malaysia (PSM) – Tan Sri (1998)
 Commander of the Order of the Defender of the Realm (PMN) – Tan Sri (2001)
 Royal Malaysia Police :
 Courageous Commander of the Most Gallant Police Order (PGPP) (1997)
 :
 Knight Commander of the Order of Taming Sari (DPTS) - Dato’ Pahlawan (1993)
 Knight Grand Commander of the Order of Taming Sari (SPTS) - Dato’ Seri Panglima (1998)
 :
 Commander of the Order of Kinabalu (PGDK) – Datuk (1996)
 :
 Grand Knight of the Order of the Crown of Pahang (SIMP) – formerly Dato’, now Dato’ Indera (1997)
 Grand Knight of the Order of Sultan Ahmad Shah of Pahang (SSAP) - Dato’ Sri (2003)
 :
 Companion of the Order of the Crown of Terengganu (SMT) (1987)
 Knight Grand Companion of the Order of Sultan Mizan Zainal Abidin of Terengganu (SSMZ) - Dato’ Seri (2003)
 :
 Knight Commander of the Most Exalted Order of the Star of Sarawak (PNBS) - Dato Sri (2003)

Foreign honours
 :
 Recipient of the Darjah Utama Bakti Cemerlang (DUBC) (2003)

Family 
Norian is married to Rokiah Ismail and has four children.

References 

1946 births
Living people
Malaysian police officers
Malaysian police chiefs
People from Perak
Officers of the Order of the Defender of the Realm
Commanders of the Order of the Defender of the Realm
Commanders of the Order of Loyalty to the Crown of Malaysia
Commanders of the Order of Kinabalu
Knights Commander of the Most Exalted Order of the Star of Sarawak
Recipients of the Darjah Utama Bakti Cemerlang